Max van Hulsteyn was consul of the Orange Free State in Madrid, Spain from 1898 until 31 May 1902.

20th-century Dutch diplomats
21st-century Dutch diplomats
Dutch emigrants to South Africa
Van Hulsteyn
Year of birth missing
Year of death missing